The Houses of Parliament of South Africa are situated in Cape Town. The building consists of three main sections: the original building, completed in 1884, and additions constructed in the 1920s and 1980s. The newer additions house the National Assembly (the lower house of the bicameral Parliament of South Africa), and the original building houses the National Council of Provinces (the upper house of Parliament).

The original parliament building was designed in a Neoclassical style, incorporating features of Cape Dutch architecture. The later additions have been so designed as to blend with the original building. The Houses of Parliament have been declared a National Heritage Site by the South African Heritage Resources Agency (SAHRA) and given grade 1 national heritage status, the highest grade set by SAHRA. 

Parliament House was severely damaged by a large fire that broke out on 2 January 2022.

History

Queen Victoria granted permission for the establishment of a parliament in the Cape Colony in 1853. The first sittings were held in the Governor's residence, the Tuynhuys, after which sittings were held in the Goede Hoop Masonic Lodge. This building was used by the South African Freemasons. (Their Lodge were called de Goede Hoop). The then upper house was housed in the old supreme court building, which itself had been the slave lodge under VOC rule.

The original parliament building

MPs noted that the masonic lodge building was unimposing, and did not command any respect.

Although opposed by then Prime Minister John Charles Molteno due to financial considerations, a committee was set up to receive designs for a new parliament building. The committee selected an elaborate design by architect Charles Freeman, and construction began on 12 May 1875, with the then Governor of the Cape Colony, Henry Barkly, laying the cornerstone.

Almost immediately it was discovered that Freeman's plans were faulty. Freeman's errors were compounded by the presence of groundwater, and a recalculation of the budget revealed that the actual costs would be many times the original figure that the government had allowed for. For his incompetence, Freeman was fired, and Henry Greaves was appointed architect in 1876. Freeman's plans were altered to exclude seemingly unnecessarily expensive features such as a central dome, statues, parapets and fountains.

Building re-commenced, but was delayed – this time by the British overthrow of the Cape government in 1878, the ensuing Confederation Wars, and finally by the building company going bankrupt in 1883. 
Greaves tenaciously completed the job however, and the large, stately, but relatively unpretentious building was finally opened in 1884.

Cape Prime Minister Thomas Scanlen, and British Governor Henry Robinson led the opening ceremony in the building, declared finally to be worthy of the country's Legislature.

Later additions

In the 1920s, Parliament commissioned Sir Herbert Baker to build an extension to the building, including a new chamber for the House of Assembly. The old Assembly chamber became the Parliamentary Dining Room, run by the catering department of South African Railways & Harbours. A further extension was created in the 1980s, when the 1910 constitution was replaced with the awkward and novel tricameral constitution which provided a parliamentary house each for Whites, Coloureds, and Indians. Further constitutional changes moved the centre of power away from the old building and towards the newer wing.

2022 fire

During the morning of 2 January 2022, a fire broke out in third-floor offices in the parliamentary precinct and spread to the lower and upper houses. By mid-morning, fire crews were still attempting to control the fire. The buildings were severely damaged. It was reported that the sprinkler system had not functioned correctly, and protection services staff were not on duty.

Police confirmed that a 49-year old man had been detained for questioning. He was subsequently arrested by the Hawks Priority Crime unit. He has reportedly been charged with arson, housebreaking and theft under the National Key Points Act, and appeared in court on 4 January. Identified by the New York Times as Zandile Christmas Mafe, 49, the suspect's sanity was questioned by prosecutors. The Times goes on to report, Mr. Mafe was "committed to a psychiatric hospital on Tuesday to determine whether he is fit to stand trial on terrorism and other charges."

See also

Union Buildings
Supreme Court of Appeal of South Africa

References

Parliament of South Africa
Buildings and structures in Cape Town
Seats of national legislatures